Shagun was an Indian Hindi language television series that aired every Monday to Thursdays 2:30pm and later at 2pm on Star Plus from 15 January 2001 to 29 April 2004. It is the story of fortune's twists and pitfalls that tear asunder the lives of two cousins tied together by a bond stronger than that of blood : the bond of love.

Overview
Shagun is the story of two cousins, Aradhana and Aarti, brought up together and so close to each other that one hardly needs words to convey her thoughts to the other. Aarti is an optimist - she believes that she has what it takes to touch the stars, if she desires. Aradhana, however, considers herself unlucky.

Cast
 Surbhi Tiwari as Aradhana
 Kabir Sadanand as Karan
 Rekha Rao as Rajrani
 Surendra Pal as Kailashnath
 Prashant Narayanan as Sumer
 Rupal Patel as Lakhi
 Shweta Agarwal / Vandita Vasa / Pooja Ghai Rawal as Aarti
 Jiten Lalwani as Suraj
 Suhita Thatte as Aunt of Aradhana and Aarti, Sister of Kailashnath
 Renu Pandey as Gayatri
 Dimple Inamdar as Piya
 Tejal Shah as Poonam
 Shweta Gulati as Juhi
 Amit Varma as Dev
 Kapil Soni as Uday
 Sachin Shroff as Prashant
 Vishal Watwani as Anjali's Brother
 Akshay Anand as Akash
 Sanjay Mitra
 Sonia Kapoor as Anjali
 Kiran Bhargava
 Sunita Rajwar
 Suhasini Mulay as Akash's mother
 Shagufta Ali as Riftabi
 Naresh Suri
 Aparna Bhatnagar
 Ekta Jain

Reception
Despite aired in an afternoon slot, it became the top rated afternoon soap. In the week ending 28 May 2001, it garnered 3.4 TVR, occupying its position in top 20 Hindi GEC. In the week ending 12 July 2003, it garnered 3.6 TVR.

References

External links
Official Website on STAR Plus
Official Website on STAR Utsav

Indian television series
2001 Indian television series debuts
2004 Indian television series endings
StarPlus original programming
UTV Television
Indian drama television series